Cristin Jalbă (born 2 September 1997) is a Moldovan football defender who plays for SCM Zalău. In his career, Jalbă also played for teams such as Speranța Nisporeni, Academia Chișinău, Dacia Chișinău or SCM Zalău, among others.

References

1997 births
Living people
Moldovan footballers
Moldova youth international footballers
Association football defenders
Moldovan Super Liga players
Speranța Nisporeni players
FC Academia Chișinău players
FC Dinamo-Auto Tiraspol players
FC Dacia Chișinău players
FC Codru Lozova players
Liga III players
CSM Ceahlăul Piatra Neamț players
Moldovan expatriate footballers
Moldovan expatriate sportspeople in Romania
Expatriate footballers in Romania
Moldova under-21 international footballers